Sir William Knyvett ( – 2 December 1515) was an English knight in the late Middle Ages. He was the son of John Knyvett and Alice Lynne, the grandson of Sir John Knyvett, and assumed the titles of Sheriff of Norfolk & Suffolk, Burgess of Melcombe, Bletchingley, & Grantham, Constable of Rising Castle.

Life
Sir William married three times. The first was to Alice Grey, daughter of John Grey, Esq., of Kempston, eldest son of Reginald Grey, 3rd Baron Grey de Ruthyn by his second wife, Joan Astley; by whom he had issue. His second marriage was to Lady Joan Stafford, daughter of Humphrey Stafford, 1st Duke of Buckingham and Lady Anne Neville, by whom he had issue. His final marriage was to Lady Joan Courtenay, widow of Sir Roger Clifford, and daughter of Thomas de Courtenay, 5th Earl of Devon, a friend of York, and his wife, Lady Margaret Beaufort; they had no issue.

Sir William Knyvett died 2 December 1515. In his will dated 18 September 1514 and proved 19 June 1516 he requested to be buried in the church of Wymondham, Norfolk.

Issue
His children by his first wife, Alice Grey, were: 

 Sir Edmund Knyvett (d.1504) of Buckenham, who married Eleanor Tyrrell, the daughter of Sir William Tyrrell of Gipping, Suffolk by Margaret, daughter of Robert Darcy, knight. Eleanor was sister of Sir James Tyrrell. Sir Edmund Knyvett, his eldest son by his first marriage, was partly disinherited by his father, who left Buckenham Castle and other properties to Sir Edward Knyvett, the eldest son of his second marriage to Joan Stafford. Children of Sir Edmund Knyvett and Eleanor Tyrrell:
 Sir Thomas Knyvett of Buckenham, Norfolk (c. 1485 – 10 August 1512) who married Muriel Howard (d.1512), the widow of John Grey, 2nd Viscount Lisle, by whom she was the mother of Elizabeth Grey, Viscountess Lisle, who was at one time betrothed to Charles Brandon, 1st Duke of Suffolk. Muriel Howard was the daughter of Thomas Howard, 2nd Duke of Norfolk, and Elizabeth Tilney. Children of Sir Thomas Knyvett and Muriel Howard, who through their mother were all first cousins to Queen Anne Boleyn and Queen Katherine Howard:
Sir Edmund (1508–1551), who by 1527 had married Anne Shelton, the daughter of Sir John Shelton of Carrow, Norfolk, and his wife, Anne Boleyn. Knyvet's wife was a sister of Mary Shelton, and also a first cousin of Anne Boleyn. Sir Edmund Knyvett and Anne Shelton had two sons.
 Katherine Knyvett, Lady Paget, married Henry Paget, 2nd Baron Paget
 Ferdinand
 Anne Knyvett, lady in waiting to Queen Katherine of Aragon, m. 1) Thomas Thursby (d.1543) of Ashwicken, the son of Thomas Thursby (d.1510), Merchant, thrice Mayor of King's Lynn and founder of Thoresby College, in 1527; and 2) Henry Spelman, the son of Sir John Spelman (d.1546), and the father of Sir Henry Spelman and of Erasmus Spelman, whose son Henry went to Virginia, by license dated 26 January 1543/4.
 Henry (died c.1546). Henry was the grandfather of Katherine Knyvett who married her third cousin Thomas Howard, 1st Earl of Suffolk and is the ancestor of the Earls of Suffolk and Berkshire
 Edmund Knyvett (d. 1 May 1539), esquire, sergeant porter to King Henry VIII, who married Joan Bourchier, the only surviving child of John Bourchier, 2nd Baron Berners, and had:
 John Knyvett (1510–1561), who m. Agnes, daughter of Sir John Harcourt of Stanton Harcourt, Oxfordshire, and had:
 Thomas Knyvett (1539–1616) of Ashwellthorpe, de jure 4th Baron Berners, High Sheriff of Norfolk from 1579, m. Muriel Parry, daughter of Sir Thomas Parry, Comptroller of the Household to Queen Elizabeth I, and had:
 Katherine Knyvett, Lady Paston, one of the writers of the Paston Letters
Abigail Knyvett, m. Sir Edmund Moundeford of Mundford and Hockwold, Norfolk the grandson of Francis Mountford, as his second wife. From his first marriage he had Sir Edmund Moundeford (1596 – May 1643), who left much of his inheritance to his half-sister, Abigail's daughter Elizabeth
 Christopher
 Sir Anthony Knyvett, knight
 James
 William
 Margaret
 Dorothy
 Anne Knyvett, lady in waiting to Katherine of Aragon, m. Sir George St. Leger (c.1475-1536) of Annery, Devon, and had Sir John St. Leger, Katherine, and George
 Anne Knyvett who married John Thwaites, Esq. 
 Bennet Knyvett, a daughter
 Elizabeth Knyvett

By his second wife, Lady Joan Stafford, Sir William Knyvett had three sons including along with three daughters:

 Sir Edward Knyvett, (d.1528) the eldest son of his second marriage, who received a great inheritance from his father at the expense of his brother. He married Anne Calthorpe, widow of John Cressener, and daughter of John Calthorpe, knight, by Elizabeth, daughter of Roger Wentworth.
 Charles Knyvett, according to Carole Rawcliffe, in The Staffords, Earls of Stafford and Dukes of Buckingham 1394-1521, Charles Knyvett witnessed against the Duke because he had "wrongfully withheld" the possessions of Elizabeth Knyvett after her death
 Robert Knyvett (c.1512–1549), gentleman, son and heir, slain in Kett's Rebellion
 John Knyvett
 Elizabeth, likely the Elizabeth Knyvett who is mentioned in her father's will in 1514 as being of a marriageable age. And also likely the Elizabeth Knyvett who died in 1518, when Edward Stafford, 3rd Duke of Buckingham gives 15l 'To M. Geddyng, toward the burying of my said cousin', after giving at Easter last 'Eliz. knevet' the 20l due to her at Lady Day. The two were related through her mother.
 Anne Knyvett who married Charles Clifford, Esq.

References

15th-century English people
Year of birth uncertain
1515 deaths
William